Professor Warren Chan is a full professor at the Institute of Biomedical Engineering and Terrence Donnelly Centre for Cellular and Biomolecular Research at the University of Toronto. He received his B.S. and PhD degree, and post-doctoral training from the University of Illinois, Indiana University, and University of California, San Diego.

His research lab is focused on the development of nanoparticles for diagnosing and treating cancer and infectious diseases.  Some of the contributions he has made to science and engineering has been (a) the development of quantum dots for biomedical applications, (b) the size and shape dependent cellular interactions of nanoparticles in vitro and in vivo, (c) the identification of the protein corona on nanoparticle and its effect on cancer targeting, and (d) the development of a smartphone-based point of care device for diagnosing infected patients.  For his research, he has won many Canadian and International Awards (e.g., NSERC E.W.R. Steacie Memorial Fellowship (Canada), International Dennis Gabor Award (Hungary), Rank Prize Fund (UK), and BF Goodrich Young Inventors Award (USA)).

He is currently an Associate Editor of ACS Nano.

References

External links
Integrated Nanotechnology & Biomedical Sciences Laboratory

Year of birth missing (living people)
Living people
University of Illinois Urbana-Champaign alumni
Indiana University Bloomington alumni
Academic staff of the University of Toronto
University of California, San Diego alumni